Patah Vir (also Romanized as Patah Vīr, Patahvīr or Patamur) is a village in Zulachay Rural District, in the Central District of Salmas County, West Azerbaijan Province, Iran. At the 2006 census, its population was 938, in 177 families.

References 

Populated places in Salmas County